The Clarke Historical Library is part of Central Michigan University in Mount Pleasant, Michigan, United States. It is located within the Charles V. Park Library on the campus. The library was founded in 1954 by Norman E. Clarke Sr., who gave his library and collections to the college, which he had attended as a young man. The library began with the 1,500 books, 60 groups of manuscripts, 150 maps, 400 visual items and 50 broadsides, including a few early papers. His collections included numerous memoirs, works of scholarships, treasures, opinion pieces, and works of fiction.

This library publishes the Michigan Historical Review twice per year. The journal is dedicated to Michigan and its history. The Clarke also houses a variety of Ernest Hemingway publications, a well-known 20th-century writer born and partially raised in Michigan. The collection includes Hemingway's papers, and photographs from his cottage on Walloon Lake in northern Michigan. Clarke Historical Library encourages individuals, groups, and organizations to use its materials to conduct research and undergraduate study. The library created a website in 1996.

The Clarke is home to a children's literature section with collections of books that range from the 17th to the 20th centuries, which includes first editions. It also maintains the archives of Central Michigan University, including the papers of peace educator EC_Warriner, who was the fourth president of Central Michigan University (then known as "Central State Normal"). There are also over 2,500 articles recording the history of Michigan, its writers and other topics involving Michigan. The Clarke preserves documents related to the history of Michigan and the Old Northwest Territory, which Norman Clarke collected over the years. Public programs are ongoing, varying in exhibits and speakers, twice a year.

Central Michigan University